Operation Dawn was a cross-border operation by the Turkish Armed Forces (in conjunction with the forces of the Kurdistan Democratic Party) into northern Iraq between 25 September and 15 October 1997 against the Kurdistan Workers' Party (PKK), following Operation Hammer earlier the same year.

Casualties 
Turkey announced fatalities of a total of 31 personnel of 3 commissioned officers, 24 soldiers, and 4 village guards; the injured at a total of 91 personnel out of 5 commissioned officers, 7 noncommissioned officers, 77 soldiers, and 2 village guards; and the total number of militants neutralized at 902, with 865 being killed and 37 being captured. Clashes between the PKK and Kurdistan Democratic Party (KDP) resulted in 'considerable losses' for the KDP.

References

1997 in Turkey
1997 in Iraq
Conflicts in 1997
Cross-border operations of Turkey into Iraq
History of the Kurdistan Workers' Party